Brazil competed at the 1956 Summer Olympics in Melbourne, Australia and Stockholm, Sweden (equestrian events). 44 competitors, 43 men and one woman took part in 28 events in 11 sports. The only Brazilian medal was the gold won by Adhemar Ferreira da Silva in men's triple jump. This was his second gold medal in the event. He was the first Brazilian to be a two-time Olympic champion.

Medalists

Athletics

Men
Track & road events

Field events

Basketball

Preliminary round

Group D

Quarterfinal

Group B

Classification 5–8

Boxing

Men

Cycling

Track
1000m time trial

Men's Sprint

Diving

Men

Women

Equestrian

Show jumping

Modern pentathlon

Three male pentathletes represented Brazil in 1956.
Men

Rowing

Brazil had five male rowers participate in one out of seven rowing events in 1956.

Men

Sailing

Open

Shooting

Four shooters represented Brazil in 1956.
Men

Swimming

Men

Weightlifting

Men

References

External links
Official Olympic Reports
International Olympic Committee results database

Nations at the 1956 Summer Olympics
1956
1956 in Brazilian sport